Pseudaletis taeniata is a butterfly in the family Lycaenidae. It is found in Nigeria, Cameroon and the Democratic Republic of the Congo.

References

Butterflies described in 2007
Pseudaletis